Pedro Ferreira may refer to:

Pedró Ferreira (footballer, born 1987), Portuguese footballer
Pedro Ferreira (footballer, born 1991), Portuguese footballer
Pedro Ferreira (footballer, born 1998), Portuguese footballer
Pedro Ferreira (footballer, born 2000), Portuguese footballer
Pedro Ferreira (swimmer) (born 1977), Portuguese swimmer
Pedro G. Ferreira (born 1968), British/Portuguese astrophysicist and author